Toloui is an Iranian surname. Notable people with the surname include:

 Ramin Toloui, American policy maker
 Roya Toloui (born 1966), Kurdish journalist

Persian-language surnames